Zhangbei station is a station on Line 14 of Shenzhen Metro in Shenzhen, Guangdong, China, which opened on 28 October 2022. It is located in Longgang District.

History
Zhangbei station added to Phase 1 of Shenzhen Metro Line 14 in January 2020. It was decided by the executive meeting of Shenzhen Municipal People's Government. At this time, the tunnel construction from Universiade to Nanyue has started. Due to tight schedule of the construction, the constructors adopted the construction scheme of "tunnel before station", designed and applied the technology of large shield tunneling and small shield construction, that is, small shield tunneling and large shield tunneling are used to cut small shield fiberglass reinforced segments. Compared with the traditional underground excavation method, this method has higher mechanization and safety performance, low cost, fast speed, and less impact on the surrounding environment.

Station layout

Exits

Gallery

References

External links
 Shenzhen Metro Zhangbei Station (Chinese)
 Shenzhen Metro Zhangbei Station (English)

Railway stations in Guangdong
Shenzhen Metro stations
Longgang District, Shenzhen
Railway stations in China opened in 2022